The 2004 League of Ireland First Division season was the 20th season of the League of Ireland First Division.

Overview
The First Division was contested by 12 teams and Finn Harps won the division. Each team played the other teams three times, totalling 33 games. The 2005  season would see the League of Ireland Premier Division revert to 12 twelve teams. To facilitate this expansion there was no promotion/relegation play-off this season and the second and third placed teams, UCD and Bray Wanderers, were automatically promoted.

Final table

Top scorers

Gallery

See also
 2004 League of Ireland Premier Division
 2004 League of Ireland Cup

References

League of Ireland First Division seasons
2004 League of Ireland
2004 in Republic of Ireland association football leagues
Ireland
Ireland